Let's Talk About Love is a Canadian comedy-drama film, directed by Jean-Claude Lord and released in 1976. A satire of television production, the film stars Jacques Boulanger as Jeannot, a television variety show host who becomes disillusioned with the television industry, and begins to reveal the behind-the-scenes behaviour of his colleagues on the air, including allegations of sexual exploitation, bribery, payola and attempts to bury celebrity scandals before they get reported.

The film featured a large ensemble cast, including Benoît Girard, Claude Michaud, Anne Létourneau, Nicole Cloutier, Véronique Béliveau, Rita Lafontaine, Françoise Berd, Amulette Garneau, Monique Mercure, Manda Parent, Pierre Curzi, Jacques DesBaillets, Jacques Famery, Muriel Dutil, Diane Guérin, Yvon Barrette, Michelle Rossignol, Gabriel Arcand, Yvette Thuot and Guy L'Écuyer

The film was inspired in part by Boulanger, himself a Quebec television variety host of the era, and his own disgust with the private behaviour of some of his colleagues. The screenplay was written by Michel Tremblay, based in part on real tape recordings Boulanger had provided from his show. It was highly controversial in its era, but later attracted a significant cult following.

References

External links

1976 films
1976 comedy-drama films
Canadian comedy-drama films
Canadian satirical films
Films shot in Montreal
Films directed by Jean-Claude Lord
French-language Canadian films
1970s Canadian films
Works by Michel Tremblay
Films about television